Gorgocephalidae is a family of trematodes belonging to the order Plagiorchiida.

Genera:
 Gorgocephalus Manter, 1966

References

Plagiorchiida